Abor Senior High School, often referred to as ABORSCO, is a Ghanaian second-cycle institution in the town of Abor in the Keta Municipal District of the Volta Region in southeast Ghana. It is a public mixed school.

History 
The school was founded on 1 October 1965 as a community private school with 15 students through the leadership of the Chief, people, and members of the Abor Youth Association (AYA). The government took over the school in the year 1982, with 54 students and 10 teachers.

See also 

 Education in Ghana
 List of senior high schools in Ghana

References 

1965 establishments in Ghana
Education in Volta Region
Educational institutions established in 1965
High schools in Ghana
Mixed schools in Ghana
Public schools in Ghana